This is a list of rivers in Guinea-Bissau. This list is arranged  by drainage basin, with respective tributaries indented under each larger stream's name.

Atlantic Ocean

Cacheu River
Farim River
Canjambari River
Ongueringão
Elia River (Rio Elia)
Mansoa River
Rio Cana
Bijemita
Safim
Rio Petu
Rio Pefiné (Pefiné River)
Geba River
Corubal River (Cocoli River) (Koliba River)
Colufe River
Mabani
Budace
Louvado
Rio Grande de Buba (Bolola River)
Quinora
Buduco
Gam Tomé
Tombali River
Como River
Cumbijã River
Balana River
Sanjota
Cacine River

References

Rand McNally, The New International Atlas, 1993.
 GEOnet Names Server

Guinea-Bissau
Rivers